Nimbochromis livingstonii, Livingston's cichlid or (locally) kalingono, is a freshwater mouthbrooding cichlid native to Lake Malawi, an African Rift Lake. It is also found in the upper Shire River and Lake Malombe. They are found in inshore areas of the lake over sandy substrates.

Morphology
A laterally compressed fish with a large mouth. Maximum reported length of male fish in the wild is  TL while females reach  TL. Colouration variable but typically mottled brown and white. The dorsal fin may also show blue coloration while maintaining an orange to red band and sometimes a white line. Adult males frequently "color up" in response to changing conditions and rapidly change from spotted camouflage to brilliant blues and greens and may even exhibit a pale golden tone. Breeding males turn a dark blue which almost completely obscures their blotched pattern. The anal fin is usually orange to red. Females are similar, but usually lack the yellow "egg spot" markings on the anal fin. Juveniles display a brown and white spotted pattern.

The distinctive colouration of this species is said to mimic that of a dead fish, and may be part of a hunting strategy.

Diet and feeding behaviour
Wild fish feed primarily on small fish, in particular Lethrinops spp. Aquarium specimens have been observed to lie on the substrate as if dead, waiting for small fish to come close in search of a meal. When a suitable target comes into range, the fish quickly lunges at the prey and usually swallows it whole.  It is this unique hunting method that gives the fish its local name, kalingono, which means "sleeper".

Reproduction
Males are polygamous and will mate with multiple females. This species is a mouthbrooder with the female incubating up to 100 eggs until they hatch and the fry become free swimming,  much like the Astatotilapia burtoni which is of the same tribe.

Economic importance
Nimbochromis livingstonii is used locally as a food fish and is also collected and traded as an aquarium fish.

Name
The identity of the person honoured in the specific name is not given in Günther's description but it is thought likely to be the Scottish missionary and explorer Dr. David Livingstone (1813-1873) who was the first known European to discover Lake Malawi in 1856, collecting the first specimens of fishes from the Lake.

See also
List of freshwater aquarium fish species

References

livingstonii
Fish described in 1894
Taxa named by Albert Günther